Kutna (also Romanized as Kūtnā and Kūtenā; also known as Gotnā) is a village in Kuhsaran Rural District, in the Central District of Qaem Shahr County, Mazandaran Province, Iran. At the 2006 census, its population was 1,221, in 336 families.

References 

Populated places in Qaem Shahr County